Karate Warriors is a 1976 Japanese martial arts film starring Sonny Chiba.

Plot
Chico arrives in a city where there are two warring gangs. Chico gets wind of a large hidden stash of heroin owned by the, now dead, former leader over all of the gangs and sets off to find it and keep the two gangs at war. Meanwhile, he has befriended a small boy whose father is a samurai assassin working for the rival gang.

Cast
Sonny Chiba
Isao Natsuyagi   
Akiko Koyama
Akane Kawasaki
Hideo Murota
Eiji Gô
Bin Amatsu
Nenji Kobayashi
Yayoi Watanabe
Tatsuo Umemiya

Release

On November 20, 2007, BCI Eclipse released the film in their Sonny Chiba Collection DVD set, which also includes Golgo 13: Assignment Kowloon, The Bullet Train, Dragon Princess, Karate Kiba, and Sister Street Fighter.

References

External links 
 

1976 films
Karate films
1976 action films
Films directed by Kazuhiko Yamaguchi
1970s Japanese-language films
1970s Japanese films